Willie Duncan was born in Iserlohn on 20 April 1955. The left-handed guitarist/vocalist joined the Spider Murphy Gang in 1982.

Willie Duncan came to Germany in 1977 from Hitchin, Hertfordshire, England. Leaving behind Trevor Walter who was later drummer for Johnny Wakelin In Zaire and The Look "I Am the Beat". Claymore formed with his friends Martin Binks on drums and Steve Hyde on bass.  They recorded their first song with singer Dave Jackson.

The Willie Duncan Band released the first single "Sommerferien" in 1983. The LP was released in 1984 titled Sightseeing Tour> As a guitarist Willie Duncan worked with Jürgen Drews and Juliane Werding.

Discography
As producer and guitarist he recorded the following;
 Paul Daly-Ten Years Gone 
 John Smith and Friends-Line by Line 
 Dave Bonney and the Saviours-That's the way it is 
 Dave Bonney-Baptized by Fire 
 Rocka Ritch-Süchtig 
 Delaurian-The Blue Album 
 Pickup-Pickup
 Guenther Sigl-Habe die Ehre(2010)

with Spider Murphy Gang
 1989: In Flagranti 
 1990: Hokuspokus 
 1997: Keine Lust auf schlechte Zeiten 
 1997: Rock'n'Roll Story 
 1999: Das komplette Konzert 
 2002: Radio Hitz 
 2004: Skandal im Lustspielhaus

DVD;

2004: 25 Jahre Rock'n'Roll (Limited edition) (340 minute concert: 16 Nov 2002)
2004: Unplugged im Maximilianeum  (143 minute concert: 15 April 2004)
2008: 30 Jahre Rock'n'Roll (269 minute concert: 3 Nov 2007)

References
 
 German Singles Chart Archives from 1956
 Media Control Chart Archives from 1960
 Spider Murphy mit ein Schotte an der Gitarre

External links

 Willie Duncan's Official website
 Reverbnation: Willie Duncan page
 Spider Murphy Gang Official website
 Spider Murphy Gang Fan site
 E.M.I. Spider Murphy Gang page 
 Lefty Guitar Players (book)

1955 births
German male musicians
Living people